The Convocation of the West, formerly the Diocese of the West, is a convocation member of the Missionary Diocese of All Saints, as a former Reformed Episcopal Church diocese, also a part of the Anglican Church in North America. It has 10 congregations in six states: Arizona, California, New Mexico, Nevada, Texas, and Washington. On April 6, 2016, the diocese transitioned to a convocation within the Missionary Diocese of All Saints.

History
The Diocese of the West was founded in 1998 as part of the Anglican Province of America (APA), a Continuing Anglican church in the Anglo-Catholic tradition. In 2008, its bishop, Richard Boyce, arranged for the diocese to affiliate with the Reformed Episcopal Church. To that point, the APA and REC had been in full communion, but Boyce sought for the Diocese of the West to have full participation in the Common Cause Partnership that led to the creation of the Anglican Church in North America in 2009. The Diocese of the West was the only diocese of the Continuing Anglican Movement to join the ACNA.

In 2011, Winfield Mott, the co-adjutor bishop of the West, became diocesan bishop upon Boyce's retirement. Anticipating Mott's retirement in 2016, and without the support of REC bishops to elect a diocesan bishop necessary for the diocese to continue, the standing committee of the Diocese of the West voted unanimously to transition from an REC diocese into a convocation within the Missionary Diocese of All Saints. The last synod of the Diocese of the West was held on April 5–6, 2016, and the organizing synod of the Convocation of the West was on April 6–7, 2016, and overlapping the concluding synod of the Diocese of the West. At the organizing synod, Winfield Mott was elected the Vicar General. He expressed his wish that the Convocation of the West would become a diocese again, with the help of the Missionary Diocese of All Saints. He was replaced the same year by Canon Michael Lenfield.

References

External links
 

Former dioceses of the Anglican Church in North America
Anglican dioceses established in the 20th century